The 66th New York State Legislature, consisting of the New York State Senate and the New York State Assembly, met from January 3 to April 18, 1843, during the first year of William C. Bouck's governorship, in Albany.

Background
Under the provisions of the New York Constitution of 1821, 32 Senators were elected on general tickets in eight senatorial districts for four-year terms. They were divided into four classes, and every year eight Senate seats came up for election. Assemblymen were elected countywide on general tickets to a one-year term, the whole Assembly being renewed annually.

On April 5, 1842, the Legislature enacted that future state elections be held on a single day, fixing the date on the Tuesday next after the first Monday in November.

State Senator John W. Taylor resigned on August 19, 1842, leaving a vacancy in the Fourth District.

At this time there were two major political parties: the Democratic Party and the Whig Party. The radical abolitionists appeared as the Liberty Party.

On September 7, 1842, the Democratic state convention met at Syracuse, and nominated again William C. Bouck for governor, and Daniel S. Dickinson for lieutenant governor.

On the same day, the Whig state convention nominated Lt. Gov. Luther Bradish for governor, and State Senator Gabriel Furman for lieutenant governor.

The Liberty Party nominated Alvan Stewart for governor, and Charles O. Shepard for lieutenant governor.

Elections
The state election was held on November 8, 1842. William C. Bouck and Daniel S. Dickinson were elected governor and lieutenant governor.

Abraham A. Deyo (2nd D.), John C. Wright (3rd D.), Sidney Lawrence, Thomas B. Mitchell (both 4th D.), Calvin T. Chamberlain (6th D.), John Porter (7th D.), Harvey Putnam (8th D.), and assemblymen John A. Lott (1st D.) and Carlos P. Scovil (5th D.) were elected to the Senate. Putnam was a Whig, the other eight were Democrats.

Sessions
The Legislature met for the regular session at the Old State Capitol in Albany on January 3, 1843; and adjourned on April 18.

George R. Davis (D) was elected Speaker with 89 votes against 32 for Willis Hall (W). Henry N. Wales (D) was elected Clerk of the Assembly with 91 votes against 35 for Philander B. Prindle (W).

On January 21, the Legislature elected Edwin Croswell (D) to succeed Thurlow Weed as State Printer.

On February 6, the Legislature re-elected State Treasurer Thomas Farrington (D).

On February 7, the Legislature re-elected U.S. Senator Silas Wright, Jr. to a six-year term beginning on March 4, 1843.

State Senate

Districts
 The First District (4 seats) consisted of Kings, New York and Richmond counties.
 The Second District (4 seats) consisted of Dutchess, Orange, Putnam, Queens, Rockland, Suffolk, Sullivan, Ulster and Westchester counties.
 The Third District (4 seats) consisted of Albany, Columbia, Delaware, Greene, Rensselaer, Schenectady and Schoharie counties.
 The Fourth District (4 seats) consisted of Clinton, Essex, Franklin, Fulton, Hamilton, Herkimer, Montgomery, St. Lawrence, Saratoga, Warren and Washington counties.
 The Fifth District (4 seats) consisted of Jefferson, Lewis, Madison, Oneida, Oswego and Otsego counties.
 The Sixth District (4 seats) consisted of Allegany, Broome, Cattaraugus, Chemung, Chenango, Livingston, Steuben, Tioga and Tompkins counties.
 The Seventh District (4 seats) consisted of Cayuga, Cortland, Onondaga, Ontario, Seneca, Wayne and Yates counties.
 The Eighth District (4 seats) consisted of Chautauqua, Erie, Genesee, Monroe, Niagara, Orleans and Wyoming counties.

Note: There are now 62 counties in the State of New York. The counties which are not mentioned in this list had not yet been established, or sufficiently organized, the area being included in one or more of the abovementioned counties.

Members
The asterisk (*) denotes members of the previous Legislature who continued in office as members of this Legislature. John A. Lott and Carlos P. Scovil changed from the Assembly to the Senate.

Employees
 Clerk: Isaac R. Elwood
 Deputy Clerks: Charles Bryan, Robert F. Salvidge
 Sergeant-at-Arms: Charles Niven
 Doorkeeper: Joel Gillett
 Assistant Doorkeeper: Martin Miller

State Assembly

Districts

 Albany County (3 seats)
 Allegany County (2 seats)
 Broome County (1 seat)
 Cattaraugus County (2 seats)
 Cayuga County (3 seats)
 Chautauqua County (3 seats)
 Chemung County (1 seat)
 Chenango County (3 seats)
 Clinton County (1 seat)
 Columbia County (3 seats)
 Cortland County (2 seats)
 Delaware County (2 seats)
 Dutchess County (3 seats)
 Erie County (3 seats)
 Essex County (1 seat)
 Franklin County (1 seat)
 Fulton and Hamilton counties (1 seat)
 Genesee County (2 seats)
 Greene County (2 seats)
 Herkimer County (2 seats)
 Jefferson County (3 seats)
 Kings County (2 seats)
 Lewis County (1 seat)
 Livingston County (2 seats)
 Madison County (3 seats)
 Monroe County (3 seats)
 Montgomery County (2 seats)
 The City and County of New York (13 seats)
 Niagara County (2 seats)
 Oneida County (4 seats)
 Onondaga County (4 seats)
 Ontario County (3 seats)
 Orange County (3 seats)
 Orleans County (1 seat)
 Oswego County (2 seats)
 Otsego County (3 seats)
 Putnam County (1 seat)
 Queens County (1 seat)
 Rensselaer County (3 seats)
 Richmond County (1 seat)
 Rockland County (1 seat)
 St. Lawrence County (2 seats)
 Saratoga County (2 seats)
 Schenectady County (1 seat)
 Schoharie County (2 seats)
 Seneca County (1 seat)
 Steuben County (3 seats)
 Suffolk County (2 seats)
 Sullivan County (1 seat)
 Tioga County (1 seat)
 Tompkins County (2 seats)
 Ulster County (2 seats)
 Warren County (1 seat)
 Washington (2 seats)
 Wayne County (2 seats)
 Westchester County (2 seats)
 Wyoming County (2 seats)
 Yates County (1 seat)

Note: There are now 62 counties in the State of New York. The counties which are not mentioned in this list had not yet been established, or sufficiently organized, the area being included in one or more of the abovementioned counties.

Assemblymen
The asterisk (*) denotes members of the previous Legislature who continued as members of this Legislature.

Party affiliations follow the result given in Niles' Register.

Employees
 Clerk: Henry N. Wales
 Sergeant-at-Arms: Pliny M. Bromley
 Doorkeeper: John W. Turner
 Assistant Doorkeeper: Isaac Satterlee
 Second Assistant Doorkeeper: Henry Rankin

Notes

Sources
 The New York Civil List compiled by Franklin Benjamin Hough (Weed, Parsons and Co., 1858) [pg. 109 and 441 for Senate districts; pg. 134 for senators; pg. 148f for Assembly districts; pg. 227f for assemblymen]
 Political History of the State of New York from January 1, 1841, to January 1, 1847, Vol III, including the Life of Silas Wright (Hall & Dickson, Syracuse NY, 1848; pg. 311 to 368)

066
1843 in New York (state)
1843 U.S. legislative sessions